Anogramma leptophylla, sometimes called Jersey fern, is a species of fern in the family Pteridaceae. It is found worldwide in temperate and subtropical regions. A rarity in the Pteridophyta, it is a fern whose sporophyte tends to have an annual life cycle.  The gametophytes of this species have the ability to become dormant and wait as much as two and a half years until conditions are appropriate for the sporophyte stage of the life-cycle.

Description
Anogramma leptophylla is a small annual fern, seldom exceeding  in height. It has delicate, two-pinnate fronds, only the inner ones being fertile and bearing linear spore cases on the undersides of the nearly circular leaflets, occupying most of their surface area. The leaf margins are not curled.

Distribution and habitat
Anogramma leptophylla has an oceanic temperate distribution. It is found in the Mediterranean area (southern France, Italy) and is widespread in North America. The only place in the British Isles in which it occurs is the island of Jersey in the Channel Islands. It grows on walls and banks, especially when there is underlying granite rock. It prefers to grow on bare soil in moist but well-drained locations as it is not very competitive.

Ecology
Other plants growing in the same habitats include the pellitory-of-the-wall Parietaria lusitanica and the Mediterranean clubmoss (Selaginella denticulata) in northern Italy, and the clubmoss, the liverwort Targionia hypophylla and the mosses Rhynchostegiella tenella and Timmiella anomala in Elba. These plants are all heat-loving and are able to survive the winter by growing in locations where warm water seeps out of crevices, giving a tropical microclimate.

References

 Molnár, C. et al. 2008., Remote, inland occurrence of the oceanic Anogramma leptophylla (L.) Link (Pteridaceae: Taenitidoideae) in Hungary, Amer. Fern J., 98(3): 128 - 138.

Pteridaceae
Flora of the Channel Islands
Flora of Southwestern Europe
Flora of Southeastern Europe
Flora of Lebanon
Flora of Australia
Plants described in 1753